Women was a Canadian indie rock band formed in Calgary in 2008. The group consisted of Patrick Flegel, Christopher Reimer, Matt Flegel and Mike Wallace. Their debut album Women was released on Chad VanGaalen's label Flemish Eye on July 8, 2008 in Canada and on Jagjaguwar in the United States on October 7, 2008. It was rumoured that the band broke up on October 29, 2010, after a fight on stage at a show at the Lucky Bar in Victoria, although their management stated that they had merely cancelled the rest of their tour.

History
The band's sound has been likened to "sunny Beach Boys pop [...] dragged into a dark alley and gleefully mutilated", as well as compared to other bands The Velvet Underground and The Zombies. Pitchfork Media named their song "Black Rice" from their debut album the 18th best track of 2008.

After the release of their debut album Women extensively toured throughout 2008 and 2009, performing over 180 times in North America, Europe and the UK. Highlight performances took place at Barcelona's Primavera Sound, Austin's SXSW, Chicago's Pitchfork Music Festival and London's The Lexington. The band has toured or performed with Mogwai, Abe Vigoda, Dungen, Deerhunter, and Eric's Trip. The song "Black Rice" was also listed by Pitchfork as the 410th best song of the 2000s.

Women's second album, Public Strain, was released in Canada, via Flemish Eye, and in the United States, UK, and Europe, via Jagjaguwar , on September 28, 2010. The album received praise from across the media spectrum, including Pitchfork, Exclaim!, Filter, and the BBC.  Public Strain also topped the !earshot Top 50 Chart in October that year.

The band began a European tour, followed by a US tour in the fall of 2010. It was rumoured that the band broke up on October 29, 2010 after a fight on stage at a show at the Lucky Bar in Victoria although their management stated that they merely cancelled the rest of their tour. Matt Flegel later confirmed in an interview with Marc Riley on BBC 6 that a fight had in fact broken out on stage between Patrick and the band, prematurely ending their tour. Pitchfork released a three-song live video in February 2011 shot in an empty factory a few weeks before the band's indefinite hiatus.

Some members of Women also played in the live band of Chad VanGaalen. Pat Flegel was a member of the band Fels-Naptha, and Michael Wallace is a former member of the bands Friendo and Azeda Booth, and toured with Porcelain Raft. Christopher Reimer toured with The Dodos during the summer and fall of 2011.

On February 8, 2012, guitarist Christopher Reimer performed at Weeds Cafe in Calgary, recorded by Brad Hawkins. Thirteen days later, on February 21, Reimer died in his sleep. In 2012 Chad van Gaalen released The Chad Tape, containing 9 Reimer solo tracks.

Following the dissolution of the band and Reimer's death, Matthew Flegel and Michael Wallace formed the band Preoccupations (formerly Viet Cong) in 2012, while Pat Flegel formed Cindy Lee.

Discography

Studio albums
 Women (Flemish Eye / Jagjaguwar, 2008)
 Public Strain (Flemish Eye / Jagjaguwar, 2010)

Extended play
 Rarities 2007-2010 (Flemish Eye / Jagjaguwar, 2020)

Singles
 "Service Animal/Grey Skies" 7" (Jagjaguwar, 2010)
 "Women / Cold Pumas / Fair Ohs / Friendo Split 7"" (Faux Discx, 2011)

Video
 Pitchfork Presents: A Three Song Live Special (Feb 2011)

Chris Reimer
 The Chad Tape (Bandcamp, 2012)

Members
Former
Patrick Flegel – guitar, vocals (2007-2012)
Matthew Flegel – bass, percussion, vocals (2007-2012)
Michael Wallace – drums (2007-2012)
Christopher Reimer – guitar, samples, vocals (2007-2012; deceased)

References

External links
 Women at Flemish Eye
 Women at Jagjaguwar

Musical groups established in 2007
Musical groups from Calgary
Canadian indie rock groups
Canadian noise rock groups
Canadian art rock groups
Musical groups disestablished in 2012
2007 establishments in Alberta
2012 disestablishments in Alberta
Jagjaguwar artists